The Kinmen Ceramics Museum is a museum in Jinhu Township, Kinmen County, Taiwan.

History
The museum is part of Kinmen Ceramic Factory which was established in 1963.

Exhibitions
The museum exhibits all kind of ceramic works and collections. In total there are around 376 works from various artists.

See also
 List of museums in Taiwan

References

Ceramics museums in Taiwan
Jinhu Township
Museums in Kinmen County